Moldova Nouă (or Bošňák) is a town in southwestern Romania in Caraș-Severin County (the historical region of Banat), in an area known as Clisura Dunării.  The town administers three villages: Măcești, Moldova Veche (Ómoldova, Стара Молдава), and Moldovița (Kiskárolyfalva, Молдавица).

The town lies on the shores of the river Danube, which separates it from Serbia. It is located at the southern extremity of Caraș-Severin County,  from the county capital, Reșița. It is crossed by national road DN57, which connects it to Oravița,  to the north, and Orșova,  to the east.

Moldova Veche
In Moldova Veche village, evidence of human habitation dating to the transition between the Neolithic and the Bronze Age has been found. Additionally, there exist traces of an unfortified Dacian settlement, similar to several others in the area. In Roman Dacia, a castrum located in the village supervised mining and navigation on the Danube. Vestiges from the Dark Ages and the Early Middle Ages have been found; during the 10th and 11th centuries, the area was controlled by Glad and later Ahtum. Serbs have been living there since their replacement of the Gepids in the 5th century. 

In 1552, when the Banat fell under Ottoman rule, Moldova Veche became the capital of a sanjak within the Temeşvar Eyalet. In 1566, at the end of Suleiman the Magnificent's reign, coins of gold (altâni) and silver (aspri) were minted there. A document of 1588 records the place under the name Mudava; this is the earliest written mention. The Slavicizied Germanic-origin toponym is still used by locals. Bogdan Petriceicu Hasdeu and the majority of Romanian philologists and historians claim that the name comes from the term of Germanic origin mulde (i.e., "hollow", "quarry" or "drainage"). In 1718, the area came under the Habsburg monarchy's control.

The village was absorbed into Moldova Nouă in 1956. It is the site of a Danube port. There is a Baptist church; the community was established in 1927, its first church built in 1967 and the present structure in 2001. Adherents are both Romanian and Serbian, with services conducted in Romanian.

Demographics
At the 2011 census, 81.2% of inhabitants were Romanians, 12.8% Serbs, 3.2% Roma, 1.3% Hungarians, and 0.8% Czechs. At the 2002 census, 88.4% were Romanian Orthodox, 4.5% Baptist, 4% Roman Catholic, and 2% Pentecostal.

Natives
 Ștefan Blănaru (born 1989), Romanian footballer
 Emilijan Josimović (1823–1897), Serbian urbanist
 Iasmin Latovlevici (born 1986), Romanian footballer
 Mihăiță Pleșan (born 1983), Romanian footballer
 Anca Pop (1984–2018), Romanian-Canadian singer-songwriter
 Cosmin Sârbu (born 1996), Romanian footballer
 Deian Sorescu (born 1997), Romanian footballer
 Clara Vădineanu (born 1986), Romanian handballer
 Ella Zeller (born 1933), Romanian table tennis player

Climate
Moldova Nouă has a humid continental climate (Cfb in the Köppen climate classification).

Notes
Aleksandra Djurić-Milovanović, "Serbs in Romania: Relationship between Ethnic and Religious Identity", Balcanica XLIII (2012), pp. 117–142

References 

Populated places in Caraș-Severin County
Towns in Romania
Monotowns in Romania
Mining communities in Romania
Populated places on the Danube
Romania–Serbia border crossings
Localities in Romanian Banat